On 9 January 2018, at approximately 8:51 p.m. local time (02:51 10 January UTC), a  7.5 earthquake struck in the Yucatán Basin of the Caribbean Sea,  east of Great Swan Island off the coast of Honduras. The earthquake was felt across Central America, and rattled windows in Tegucigalpa.  The earthquake was also felt in the Cayman Islands.

Tsunami advisories were issued for certain areas by the U.S. Tsunami Warning Center. They were later cancelled after further monitoring. No tsunami was generated since the earthquake was an almost pure strike-slip on a near vertical plane, producing little upward movement of the sea floor that would cause a large displacement of water.

Earthquake
The area just to the west also produced a large earthquake in 2009 that measured 7.3 on the moment magnitude scale. According to a finite fault model created by the U.S. Geological Survey, the earthquake generated a maximum slip of 24 meters in a compact rupture zone. Three sub-events were discovered during the rupture process, the third of which, occurred at a velocity exceeding that of the shear wave. Propagating at 5 km/s, faster than the shear wave velocity of 4 km/s, the event is classified as a supershear earthquake.

Damage
No major damage was reported. However some homes suffered cracks in walls.

Tsunami
A  surge was observed in George Town, Cayman Islands.

See also
List of earthquakes in 2018
List of earthquakes in the Caribbean

References

External links

2018 earthquakes
Earthquake
2018 Honduras
January 2018 events in North America
2018 tsunamis
Supershear earthquakes